Lesicheri Glacier is the 7 km long and 3 km wide glacier on Oscar II Coast in Graham Land situated west of Minzuhar Glacier and northeast of Erden Glacier.  It drains the southeast slopes of Forbidden Plateau, and flows southeastwards to join Jorum Glacier west of Yordanov Nunatak.  The feature is named after the settlement of Lesicheri in Northern Bulgaria.

Location
British mapping in 1976.

Maps
 British Antarctic Territory.  Scale 1:200000 topographic map.  DOS 610 Series, Sheet W 65 62.  Directorate of Overseas Surveys, Tolworth, UK, 1976.
 Antarctic Digital Database (ADD). Scale 1:250000 topographic map of Antarctica. Scientific Committee on Antarctic Research (SCAR). Since 1993, regularly upgraded and updated.

References
 Lesicheri Glacier. SCAR Composite Antarctic Gazetteer.
 Bulgarian Antarctic Gazetteer. Antarctic Place-names Commission. (details in Bulgarian, basic data in English)

External links
 Lesicheri Glacier. Copernix satellite image

Glaciers of Oscar II Coast
Bulgaria and the Antarctic